Suzzara Sport Club is an Italian association football club located in Suzzara, Lombardy. It currently plays in Promozione. Its colors are white and black.

The club was founded in 1919 and spend 2 seasons in Serie B.

References

External links
Official homepage

Football clubs in Italy
Football clubs in Lombardy
Association football clubs established in 1919
Serie B clubs
Serie C clubs
Serie D clubs
1919 establishments in Italy